Bloodclot is a song by the American punk rock band Rancid. It is the second track on the group's fourth studio album Life Won't Wait (1998) and was released as the album's first single.

Track listing
"Bloodclot" - 2:45
"Endrina" - 1:14
"Stop" - 1:41

In popular culture
"Bloodclot" was featured in the ESPN X-Games Pro Boarder.
The song was also featured in the film Idle Hands (1999).

References

1998 singles
Rancid (band) songs
Songs written by Tim Armstrong
Songs written by Lars Frederiksen
1998 songs
Epitaph Records singles